Stuhlmann's golden mole (Chrysochloris stuhlmanni) is a species of mammal in the family Chrysochloridae. It is found in Cameroon, Democratic Republic of the Congo, Kenya, Tanzania, and Uganda. Its natural habitats are subtropical or tropical moist montane forest and high-elevation shrubland, Mediterranean-type shrubby vegetation, subtropical or tropical dry grassland, arable land, and pasture.

References

Afrosoricida
Mole
Least concern biota of Africa
Taxonomy articles created by Polbot
Mammals described in 1894
Albertine Rift montane forests